Joe McGinniss Jr. (born 1970) is an American writer, and author of The Delivery Man, Carousel Court and a forthcoming memoir.

Biography
He graduated from Swarthmore College and later American University, where he obtained a Masters in Public Policy. McGinniss worked for Mayor Willie Brown in San Francisco as a political consultant and community liaison focusing on development of programs for at-risk youths.

The Delivery Man was published January 15, 2008. His short fiction has appeared in Las Vegas Weekly, and the New Yorker.

Carousel Court was published on August 2, 2016. It was a finalist for the 2016 Kirkus Prize.
McGinniss lives in Washington, D.C. He is the son of American writer Joe McGinniss.

Works

Footnotes

External links
Interview with McGinniss published in Las Vegas Weekly, November 1, 2007.
USA Today profile

1970 births
Living people
21st-century American novelists
American male novelists
Place of birth missing (living people)
21st-century American male writers